Jan Zakrzewski may refer to:

 Jan Dołęga-Zakrzewski (1866–1936), Polish surveyor, activist and publicist
 Jan Andrzej Zakrzewski (1920–2007), Polish journalist, writer and translator
 Jan Zakrzewski (runner) (born 1970), Polish distance runner

See also

 Zakrzewski